Blanche E. Braxton was the first African American female lawyer in Massachusetts.

Braxton was graduated from Portia Law School in 1921. She lived in Roxbury, Massachusetts.

On March 16, 1923, Braxton became the first African American woman to be admitted to the bar in Massachusetts. Ten years later, on March 21, 1933, she became the first African American woman admitted to practice before the United States District Court in Massachusetts. Braxton was in private practice with an office at 412 Massachusetts Avenue.

The Massachusetts Black Women Attorneys Foundation provides a scholarship each year named in home of Braxton. It is "awarded to law students of color who have demonstrated outstanding academic excellence, a commitment to public service, and a dedication to the advancement of minoritized people through the legal process."

See also
List of first women lawyers and judges in Massachusetts

Notes

References

African-American women lawyers
African-American lawyers
Massachusetts lawyers
People from Roxbury, Boston